Ratnawati River or Raato is a perennial river that originates from the Himalayan range of Nepal and terminates into the Indian states of Bihar.

This river always keeps making the headlines due to its flood during the rainy season.

References 

Rivers of Nepal